Marco Botti (born 23 December 1976) is an Italian racehorse trainer who is based in Great Britain, working from his stable Prestige Place in Newmarket, Suffolk.  Botti is the son of Alduino Botti, a champion racehorse trainer in Italy, and worked for trainers Luca Cumani, Ed Dunlop and the Godolphin Racing organization before becoming a trainer in his own right. Botti's first winner as a trainer came in 2006 and he has become established a successful trainer since then, gaining Group One victories in France, Canada and the United States.

Major wins

 Canadian International Stakes - (1) - Joshua Tree (2012)
 Natalma Stakes - (1) - Capla Temptress (2017)

 Prix du Moulin de Longchamp - (1) - Excelebration (2011)
 Prix Royal-Oak - (2) - Tac De Boistron (2013, 2014)

 Beverly D. Stakes - (1) - Euro Charline (2014)
 Goodwood Stakes - (1) - Gitano Hernando (2009)

References

1976 births
Living people
Italian horse trainers